Ayandur is an Indian village in Thirokvilur Taluk, Kallakurichi district, Tamil Nadu. Ayandur is close to the towns Thiruvanamali and Villupram.

Ayandur Railway Station is on the Thiruvannamalai-Viluppuram railway link that connects Viluppuram and Katpadi. Train connections include Villuppuram-Vellore (future) and Pondy - Howrah Express. The railway station is located about 21 km from Viluppuram. Villuppuram Junction Railway Station is the nearest railhead. Mambazhappattu Railway Station is 4 km away.

References 

Villages in Kallakurichi district